Vellarvally  is a village in Kannur district in the Indian state of Kerala.

Demographics
As of 2011 Census, Vellarvelly had a population of 7,769 of which 3,834 are males and 3,935 are females. Vellarvelly village spreads over  area with 1,851 families residing in it. The sex ratio of Vellarvelly was 1,026 lower than state average of 1,084. Population of children in the age group  0-6 was 703 (9%) which constitutes 365 males and 338 females. Vellarvelly had an overall literacy of 95.2% higher than state average of 94%. The male literacy stands at 96.6% and female literacy was 93.9%.

Transportation
The national highway passes through Kannur town.  Mangalore and Mumbai can be accessed on the northern side and Cochin and Thiruvananthapuram can be accessed on the southern side.  The road to the east of Iritty connects to Mysore and Bangalore.   The nearest railway station is Kannur on Mangalore-Palakkad line. There are airports at Mangalore and Calicut.

References

Villages near Iritty